The 2016 Israel Super Cup is the 21st Israel Super Cup (26th, including unofficial matches, as the competition wasn't played within the Israel Football Association in its first 5 editions, until 1969), an annual Israel football match played between the winners of the previous season's Top Division and Israel State Cup. This is the second time since 1990 that the match was staged, after a planned resumption of the cup was cancelled in 2014.

The game was played between Hapoel Be'er Sheva, champions of the 2015–16 Israeli Premier League and Maccabi Haifa, winners of the 2015-16 Israeli State Cup. As it has ended with the score of 4-2 to Hapoel Be'er Sheva after they were losing to 2-0 in the half time.

Match details

References

Israel Super Cup
2016–17 in Israeli football
Israel Super Cup
Super Cup 2016
Super Cup 2016
Israel Super Cup matches